Adam Patrick McDonnell (born 14 May 1997) is an Irish professional footballer who plays as a midfielder for League of Ireland Premier Division side Bohemians.

Playing career

Ipswich Town
McDonnell signed with Ipswich Town from Shelbourne in August 2014, having previously had trials at Manchester United and Bolton Wanderers. However, he was unable to feature for the "Tractorboys" until his 18th birthday due to FIFA regulations, much to manager Mick McCarthy's annoyance. He made his debut on 25 August 2015, in a 4–1 League Cup victory over Doncaster Rovers at the Keepmoat Stadium.

Aldershot Town (loan)
On August 30, McDonnell was loaned out to Vanarama National League side Aldershot Town where he made 14 appearances and scored 4 goals.
McDonnell was recalled from loan in December 2017 due to injury problems at Ipswich Town. He featured on the bench in an EFL Championship game against  Wolverhampton Wanderers
which Ipswich Town went on to lose 1-0 at the Molineux Stadium.

Return to Aldershot Town
On 26 January 2018, following his release from Ipswich, McDonnell returned to Aldershot Town on a one-and-half-year deal.

Boreham Wood
On 1 July 2019, McDonnell signed for fellow National League side Boreham Wood, signing a two-year deal.

Sligo Rovers
On 11 July 2021, McDonnell signed for Sligo Rovers.

Career statistics

Honours
Individual
Aldershot Town Player of the Year: 2018–19

References

External links

1997 births
Living people
Association footballers from Dublin (city)
Republic of Ireland association footballers
Republic of Ireland youth international footballers
Association football midfielders
Home Farm F.C. players
Shelbourne F.C. players
Ipswich Town F.C. players
Aldershot Town F.C. players
Boreham Wood F.C. players
Sligo Rovers F.C. players
Bohemian F.C. players
Republic of Ireland expatriate association footballers
Expatriate footballers in England
Irish expatriate sportspeople in England
League of Ireland players
English Football League players
National League (English football) players